Diethelm may refer to:

Surnames 
 Barbara Diethelm (born 1962), Swiss painter
 Caspar Diethelm (1926–1997), Swiss composer
 Hans Diethelm (born 1967), Swiss former skier
 Michael Diethelm (born 1985), Swiss footballer
 Pascal Diethelm (born 1944), Swiss anti-tobacco activist
 Rolf Diethelm (born 1940), Swiss former ice hockey player

First names 
 Diethelm Ferner (born 1941), German football coach
 Diethelm Sack (born 1948), German businessman
 Diethelm von Eichel-Streiber (1914–1996), German Luftwaffe pilot

Middle names 
 Heidi Diethelm Gerber (born 1969), Swiss sport shooter

See also 
 24858 Diethelm, an asteroid named after Swiss astronomer Roger Diethelm
 DKSH, a Swiss company whose name stands for DiethelmKellerSiberHegner